Commandments for the Molecular Age is an EP by Mentallo & The Fixer, released on May 30, 2006 by Alfa Matrix.

Reception
Marc Tater of Chain D.L.K. commended Gary Dassing's compositional technique. Similarly Industrial Reviews awarded the album three out of five stars praised Dassing's multi-layered industrial music compositions and complex programming. Terrorverlag commended the band for remaining energetic and danceable and said the longform tracks were worth the listeners time to engage with.

Track listing

Personnel
Adapted from the Commandments for the Molecular Age liner notes.

Mentallo & The Fixer
 Gary Dassing (as Mentallo) – vocals, programming, producer, engineering, mixing, cover art, photography

Additional performers
 John Bustamante – additional vocals (1)
 Dwayne Dassing (as The Fixer) – mastering, editing

Production and design
 Benoît Blanchart – design

Release history

References

External links 
 
 Commandments for the Molecular Age at iTunes

2006 EPs
Mentallo & The Fixer albums
Alfa Matrix EPs